Alexandru Angelo Dan (born 30 January 1994), is a Romanian footballer who plays as a midfielder. He previously played for Mureșul Deva, Târgu Mureș, Pandurii Târgu Jiu, Rapid București, Universitatea Cluj, Metalul Reșița and Cetate Deva.

References

External links
 
 

1994 births
Living people
People from Deva, Romania
Romanian footballers
Association football midfielders
Romania youth international footballers
Romania under-21 international footballers
Liga I players
Liga II players
CSM Deva players
CS Pandurii Târgu Jiu players
FC Rapid București players
FC Universitatea Cluj players
CS Sportul Snagov players